Massacre of the Innocents is a painting by the Italian Baroque painter Guido Reni, created in 1611 for the Basilica of San Domenico in Bologna, but now in the Pinacoteca Nazionale in that same city.

Description
The painting is based on the biblical episode of the Massacre of the Innocents, described in the Gospel of Matthew. The work shows a series of episodes at the same time but is classically composed with each element carefully mirrored by an answering one.

Two killer soldiers, one portrayed from behind while rushing on a screaming woman, and one kneeling towards the mothers with their children, hold knives in the right hand. The mothers are reacting in different ways: one is screaming and attempting to escape the soldiers who has grabbed her hair, another is fleeing towards the right while embracing her child, while another, in the lower left corner, is holding her child on her shoulders; another mother tries to stop a soldier with her left hand, and a kneeling woman is praying towards the sky above the children which have already been slaughtered.

In The World as Will and Representation, Schopenhauer wrote that Reni made a blunder in this painting by depicting figures crying out. Because painting is a mute art, Schopenhauer believed the silent portrayal of shrieking to be ludicrous, and judged that  "...this great artist made the mistake of painting six shrieking, wide-open, gaping mouths".

References and sources
References

Sources

External links
 

Paintings by Guido Reni
1611 paintings
Reni
Paintings in the collection of the Pinacoteca Nazionale di Bologna
Christian art about death
Angels in art